Europe 1, formerly known as Europe n° 1, is a privately owned radio station created in 1955. Owned and operated by Lagardère Active, a subsidiary of the Lagardère Group, it is one of the leading radio broadcasting stations in France and its programmes can be received throughout the country. In January 2022 the conservative media mogul Vincent Bolloré took over the station.

History
In 1955, to circumvent the prohibition of commercial broadcasting in France after the Second World War, Europe n° 1 was established in the Saarland, a German state that borders France and Luxembourg. Transmissions were not legally authorised, however, until France's post-war administration of the Saarland ceased and sovereignty returned to West Germany in 1957; so, during its first two years (1955–1957), under the direction of Louis Merlin, who had defected from Radio Luxembourg, Europe n° 1 was a pirate radio station. In 1959 the French government bought part of the broadcasting corporation, and this interest is administered today by the Lagardère Group. All programming has always been produced in Paris. For the few parts of France who can't receive the FM signal, longwave broadcast still exists : the programme feed is transferred over ISDN lines to the transmitting station situated on the territory of the villages of Berus and Felsberg in the Saarland, Germany.

From its beginning, Europe n°1's priorities were two-fold: first, news and cultural information with an emphasis on eyewitness accounts rather than an announcer with a script; second, shows aimed at establishing bonds with listeners, including plays, contests, informal talk, popular music, and street-level politics.  In both respects, it was a departure from radio formats of the day.

In the 1960s, Europe 1 pioneered a new tone in French radio. Salut les copains became an icon of popular culture and the baby boom generation.  Europe 1 played a role in the May 68 political crisis by being the principal source of information untainted by government sanction; it was nicknamed "barricade radio".  In the 1970s, President Giscard d'Estaing criticized its "mocking" tone.  When the industrialist Jean-Luc Lagardère became president of Europe 1 group, some feared the network might lose its independent point of view.

Since the 1980s, Europe 1 has experienced decreases in audience, and average age of listeners has steadily increased. Both can be traced to the proliferation of FM radio, after socialist President François Mitterrand made FM private radio legal in 1981. In 1986, for equality, the regulation authorities gave FM frequencies to Europe 1 and other peripheral radios still emitting from outside France. A network of Europe 1 FM transmitters was established within France. They later had to be shared with Europe 2, now Virgin Radio. In the 1990s, Europe 1 became a news and talk network. Jean-Pierre Elkabbach became president in 2005. He was dismissed by the CSA (Comité de Surveillance de l'Audiovisuel) after announcing the death of Pascal Sevran prematurely in June 2008 and was replaced by Alexandre Bompard, former Director of the Sports at Canal+.

Today, Europe 1 is France's fifth most popular network, with the other four being RTL (radio-television Luxembourg), France Inter (state-owned, general), NRJ (music) and France Info (state-owned, news).

Europe 1 also became a supplementary active member of the European Broadcasting Union in 1978 and in 1982, an active member.

Programming
Over the last fifty years, the best-known programs on Europe 1 have included: 'Pour ceux qui aiment le jazz' ("For those who love jazz") hosted by Daniel Filipacchi and Franck Ténot, 'Signé Furax' ("Signed, Furax", a comic adventure serial), 'Salut les copains' ("Hi, friends", a pop music programme), 'Campus' (book reviews, interviews with literary personalities, and chat about current events and culture), 'Vous êtes formidables' (a programme devoted to "demonstrations of solidarity"), 'Bonjour, monsieur le maire' (aimed at rural France), 'L'horoscope de Madame Soleil' (astrology), 'Top 50' (a reprise of the musical charts), and 'Le club de la presse' ("Press Club", political conversation). BBC Radio 5 had a translated version of Top 50 called Le Top (with Marc et La Mèche) from 1990 to 1994.

Noted journalists, presenters, and performers have included: Patrick Topaloff, Maurice Siegel, Jean Gorini, André Arnaud, Pierre Bouteiller, Pierre Bellemare, Francis Blanche, Daniel Filipacchi, Frank Ténot, Lucien Morisse, Robert Willar, Albert Simon, Laurent Ferrari and Madame Soleil. Former is Wendy Bouchard. She was succeeded by Laurence Ferrari in 2014.

In June 2021, Arnaud Lagardère, the owner of Europe 1, presented the new programming of Europe 1, which revealed an alignment of the station's programming with the news channel CNews, including a joint show presented by Laurence Ferrari. This announcement led to a strike by the employees of Europe 1 expressing the concern that the station will lose its journalistic independence and become influenced by partisan politics.

Europe 1 on longwave
Europe 1 has been broadcast in France, from France, through a dense FM network since 1986, but the station was also broadcast on longwave by Europe 1's longwave transmitter until the end of 2019. The longwave feed was transmitted by Europäische Rundfunk- und Fernseh-AG (in English, European Radio and Television Company), broadcasting on longwave at 183 kHz from Felsberg in the Saarland. Car radios in France scanned in 3 kHz steps making it easy to tune 183 kHz.

For longwave, the Felsberg antenna system beamed Europe 1's signal southwestward towards France. In the easterly direction, transmissions were attenuated, so, in Eastern Europe, only a weak signal could be heard.  However, because of a defect in the antenna system, only the carrier frequency was properly screened to the east; the sidebands suffered less attenuation, so that, in the east, sideband reception was adequate (especially if using an SSB receiver) but distorted. Following the collapse of one mast in the four-mast phased array on 8 October 2012, the two-mast reserve antenna was used, resulting in a reduced signal in parts of France but a stronger and undistorted signal in northern Europe and the British Isles.

Carrier frequencies on the longwave band are assigned as integer multiples of nine kHz ranging from 153 to 279 kHz.  However, the Europe 1 transmitter's frequency, 183 kHz, was offset from the usual nine kHz multiples established under the Geneva Plan.

For longwave, in Felsberg, the four guyed antenna masts which were erected in 1954 and 1955 average 277 metres in height. The building where the transmitters were housed is an architecturally unusual, prestressed-concrete construction that needs no internal supporting columns. It has been designated an architectural monument by the European Union and is a protected structure.

It was reported on 23 December 2019 that an email from Lagardère Active had confirmed that the longwave service of Europe 1 would cease transmission at midnight CET on 1 January 2020.
In the event, Europe 1 longwave transmission ceased on 31 December 2019 at 23:30 CET.

Visual identity

Logos

Slogans
 1965 - 1975: Je choisis, Europe 1 !
 1975 - 1981: Europe 1, c'est naturel
 1981 - 1986: De grands moments, à chaque instants
 1986 - 2000: Europe 1 c'est la pêche
 2000 - 2001: Europe 1, c'est bien
 2001 - 2005: Europe 1, ça me parle
 2005 - 2009: Parlons-nous
 2009 - 2013: Europe 1, bien entendu
 2013 - 2014: Europe 1 réveille les Français
 2014 - 2016: Europe 1, Un temps d'avance
 2016 - 2018: Europe 1, Mieux capter son époque
 2019: On est bien, sur Europe 1
 2019: Europe 1, bien dans son époque
 Since 2019: Écoutez le monde changer

Hosts

Fanny Agostini
Elisabeth Assayag
Nicolas Barré
Jean-Rémi Baudot
Matthieu Belliard
Stéphane Bern
Nicolas Beytout
Catherine Blanc 
Matthieu Bock
Wendy Bouchard
Julian Bugier
Laurent Cabrol
Marion Calais
Nicolas Canteloup
Nicolas Carreau
Mathieu Charrier
Benoit Clair
Pascale Clark
François Clauss 
Patrick Cohen
Frédéric Dabi 
Thierry Dagiral
Michaël Darmon 
Valérie Darmon
Olivier Delacroix
Michel Denisot 
Valentine Desjeunes 
Pierre de Vilno
Olivier Duhamel
Emmanuel Duteil
Carole Ferry
François Geffrier
Mélanie Gomez 
Sébastien Guyot
Didier Hameau
Aurélie Herbemont
Pierre Herbulot
Vincent Hervouët
Christophe Hondelatte
Sébastien Krebs
Jérôme Lacroix
Sophie Larmoyer 
Fabien Lecœuvre 
Marguerite Lefebvre
Anne Le Gall
Philippe Legrand 
Thierry Léger
Fabienne Le Moal 
Régis Le Sommier
Sonia Mabrouk
Hélène Mannarino 
Théo Maneval 
Sabine Marin 
Laurent Mariotte 
Axel May
Émilie Mazoyer 
Anicet Mbida 
Isabelle Millet 
Jimmy Mohamed 
Lénaïg Monier 
Isabelle Morizet 
Catherine Nay 
Matthieu Noël 
Julien Pearce 
Roland Perez 
Virginie Phulpin 
Olivier Poels
Eva Roque 
Lionel Rosso 
Anne Roumanoff 
Virginie Salmen 
Marion Sauveur 
Josef Schovanec
Frédéric Taddéï 
Sophie Tusseau
Philippe Vandel 
Xavier Yvon
Hélène Zélany 
Vanessa Zha

Former presenters

Nikos Aliagas (2011-2019)
 Yann Arribard
 Arthur (1992-1996)
 Laurent Baffie (2007-2011)
 Pierre-Louis Basse (until 2004 then 2005-2011)
 Christian Barbier (1967-1998)
 Pierre Bellemare (1955-1986)
 Francis Blanche
 Maurice Biraud
 Faustine Bollaert (2004-2012)
 Denis Brogniart (1991-2006)
 Daphné Bürki (2017-2018)
 Benjamin Castaldi (2000-2004)
 Nicolas Charbonneau (until summer 2007)
 Coluche (1978-1979 then 1985-1986)
José Covès (1977-2019)
Céline Da Costa (2013-2015, 2018-2020) 
 Jean-Luc Delarue (1987-1995)
 Alexandre Delpérier (2008-2010)
 François Diwo (1973-1987) 
Jean Doridot (Summer 2018)
 Michel Drucker (1983-1987 then 2008-2013)
 Caroline Dublanche (1999-2018)
 Franck Ferrand (2003-2018)
 Daniel Filipacchi (1955-1968)
 Marc-Olivier Fogiel (2008-2011)
 Cyril Hanouna (2013-2016)
 Yann Hegann (1973-1987)
 Christian Jeanpierre (2006-2008)
 François Jouffa (1968 then 1982 then 1990-1996)
 Harold Kay (1969-1986)
 Jean-Loup Lafont (1970-1977)
 Laurent Luyat (2001-2008)
 Julia Martin (2006-2017)
Helena Morna (2008-2019)
 Christian Morin (1972-1987)
 Nagui (2009-2011)
Sophie Péters (2008-2019)
 Jacques Pradel (1997-2010)
 Pascal Pouret (1988-1991)
Isabelle Quenin (2008-2018)
 Jean Roucas (1986-1994)
 Jean-Paul Rouland
 Jacques Rouland (1978-1984)
 Willy Rovelli (2009-2017)
 Alexandre Ruiz (2008-2011)
 Marion Ruggieri (2011-2016)
 Laurent Ruquier (1999-2014) 
 Eugène Saccomano (1996-2001)
 Dominique Souchier (1988-2012)
 Alessandra Sublet (2014-2015, 2016-2017)
 Pierre Thivolet (2007)
 Frédéric Taddeï (2005-2011)
 Frank Ténot (1955-1968)
 Thomas Thouroude (2016-2018)
 Marc Toesca (1984-1996)
 Patrick Topaloff
 Robert Willar (1969-1986)
 Jean Yanne
 Jacky Gallois (1983-2016)
 Jean-Philippe ALLAIN (1970-1978)

Former journalists 
David Abiker (2010-2019)
Antonin André (2008-2011, 2012-2017)
Jean-Michel Aphatie (2015-2016, 2018-2019)
 André Arnaud
Jean-Philippe Balasse (1994-2020)
 Jean-Charles Banoun (1998-2013)
Laurent Bazin (2004-2005, 2018)
 Julien Besançon (1955-1970)
Guy Birenbaum (2007-2014)
 Christian Boner (1996-2008)
 Guillaume Cahour (2010-2012)
 Yves Calvi (1996-2005) 
Guy Carlier (2009-2014, 2016-2018)
 Aymeric Caron (2009-2011)
Hervé Chabalier (2013-2017)
Arlette Chabot (2011-2015)
Pauline Clavière (Summer 2018)
 Patrick Cohen (2008-2010)
Yves Coppens (Summer 2018)
 Gérard Carreyrou
 Antoine Cormery (1991)
 Michaël Darmon (2011-2016)
 Jean-Claude Dassier (1968-1985)
 Nicolas Demorand (2010-2011)
 Jean-Michel Dhuez (1999-2013)
Bruno Donnet (2017-2018)
 Jérôme Dorville (1999-2008)
David Doukhan (2013-2019)
 Marie Drucker (2008-2010)
Raphaëlle Duchemin (2017-2020)
 Albert Ducrocq
 Guillaume Durand (1978-1987, 1999-2004, 2007–2008)
 Valérie Durier (1991-2008)
 Benoît Duquesne (1982-1988 then 2007-2008)
 Jean-Pierre Elkabbach (1981-2016)
 Myriam Encaoua (2016-2017)
 Raphaël Enthoven (2015-2018)
 Nicolas Escoulan (2017)
 Samuel Etienne (2013-2017)
 Emmanuel Faux (1987-2017)
 Michel Field (1995-2015)
 Thierry Fréret (1987-2010) 
 Jean Gorini
Laurent Guimier (1994-2005, 2011-2014)
 Pierre Guyot (1995-1998)
Claire Hazan (until 2018)
Pascal Humeau (2006-2011)
Jérôme Ivanichtchenko (2014-2017)
Hélène Jouan (2017-2019)
 Thomas Joubert (2008-2017)
Marion Lagardère (2017-2018)
Thibault Lambert (2018-2020)
 Ivan Levaï (1972-1987)
Nathalie Levy (2019-2020)
Emmanuel Maubert (2006-2013)
 Jean-Marc Morandini (2003-2016)
 Étienne Mougeotte (1968 puis 1974 - 1981)
 Géraldine Muhlmann (2017-2018)
Benjamin Muller (2013-2019)
 Fabien Namias (2017)
 Robert Namias (1969-1984)
 Jacques Paoli
Shanel Petit (2016-2019)
Benjamin Petrover (2008-2014)
Nicolas Poincaré (2011-2018)
Bernard Poirette (2018-2020)
Natacha Polony (2012-2017)
 Patrick Roger (2011-2016)
 Caroline Roux (2012-2016)
 Eugène Saccomano (1970-2001)
 Maurice Siegel
 Albert Simon (Météo)
Anne Sinclair (2014-2016)
 Thomas Sotto (2013-2017)
 Maxime Switek (2005-2018)
 Bruce Toussaint (2011-2013)
 Benjamin Vincent (2003-2009)
Géraldine Woessner (2012-2019)
 Edmond Zucchelli (1985-1998)

Former columnists
Fabrice d'Almeida (2018-2019)
 Raphaëlle Baillot (2017-2018)
Pierre Bellemare (2013-2015)
 Valérie Bénaïm (2013-2016)
Anne Cazaubon (2015-2018)
Julien Cazarre (2017-2018)
 Bertrand Chameroy (2015-2016, 2017-2018)
 Daniel Cohn-Bendit (2013-2018)
Jérôme Commandeur (2010-2018)
Jean-Louis Debré (2016-2017)
Nadia Daam (2017-2018)
Estelle Denis (2015-2016)
Axel de Tarlé (1996-2020)
Pierre Dezeraud (2019-2020)
 Louise Ekland (2016-2017)
Jean-Pierre Foucault (2014-2016)
Bernard Fripiat (2015-2020)
Mickaël Frison (2017-2018)
Thierry Geffrotin (1997-2020)
Cyrielle Hariel (2017-2018)
Michaël Hirsch (2017-2018)
Gérald Kierzek (2014-2018)
Cyril Lacarrière (2017-2018, 2019-2020)
Jean-Pierre Montanay (2019-2020)
Jérémy Michalak (2004-2014, 2016-2017)
Didier Roustan (2017-2018)
 Mathilde Terrier (2017-2018)
Julia Vignali (2016-2017)
 Ariel Wizman (2017-2018)

See also

 Longwave transmitter Europe 1
 Transmitter Building Europe 1
 Telesaar

References

External links

 

European Broadcasting Union members
Former pirate radio stations
Longwave radio stations
Lagardère Active
Radio stations established in 1955
Radio stations in France
1955 establishments in West Germany
News and talk radio stations